Viam Pillay is a Fijian politician who served as the Assistant Minister for Agriculture of Fiji from 2017 to 2022.

References

Living people
FijiFirst politicians
Government ministers of Fiji
Year of birth missing (living people)